Solute carrier family 9, subfamily B (NHA2, cation proton antiporter 2), member 2 is a protein that in humans is encoded by the SLC9B2 gene.

Function 

Sodium–hydrogen antiporters, such as NHEDC2, convert the proton motive force established by the respiratory chain or the F1F0 mitochondrial ATPase into sodium gradients that drive other energy-requiring processes, transduce environmental signals into cell responses, or function in drug efflux.

References

Further reading